Lockdown is a television series appearing on the National Geographic Channel. The series is an educational look into prisons and jails in the United States, presented in a documentary format. Lockdown is known in some regions as America's Hardest Prisons.  Reruns of the series currently air on The Justice Network.

Development 
Ex-con Larry Lawton was contacted to be a consultant for the show, but didn't accept it because the show didn't allow him to "discuss what really goes on in the prison system."

Episodes

Season 1

Season 2

References

External links
Official website

National Geographic (American TV channel) original programming
2006 American television series debuts
2007 American television series endings
2000s American documentary television series